Extreme value theory or extreme value analysis (EVA)  is a branch of statistics dealing with the extreme deviations from the median of probability distributions. It seeks to assess, from a given ordered sample of a given random variable, the probability of events that are more extreme than any previously observed. Extreme value analysis is widely used in many disciplines, such as structural engineering, finance, earth sciences, traffic prediction, and geological engineering. For example, EVA might be used in the field of hydrology to estimate the probability of an unusually large flooding event, such as the 100-year flood. Similarly, for the design of a breakwater, a coastal engineer would seek to estimate the 50-year wave and design the structure accordingly.

Data analysis
Two main approaches exist for practical extreme value analysis.

The first method relies on deriving block maxima (minima) series as a preliminary step. In many situations it is customary and convenient to extract the annual maxima (minima), generating an "Annual Maxima Series" (AMS).

The second method relies on extracting, from a continuous record, the peak values reached for any period during which values exceed a certain threshold (falls below a certain threshold). This method is generally referred to as the "Peak Over Threshold" method (POT).

For AMS data, the analysis may partly rely on the results of the Fisher–Tippett–Gnedenko theorem, leading to the generalized extreme value distribution being selected for fitting. However, in practice, various procedures are applied to select between a wider range of distributions. The theorem here relates to the limiting distributions for the minimum or the maximum of a very large collection of independent random variables from the same distribution. Given that the number of relevant random events within a year may be rather limited, it is unsurprising that analyses of observed AMS data often lead to distributions other than the generalized extreme value distribution (GEVD) being selected.

For POT data, the analysis may involve fitting two distributions: one for the number of events in a time period considered and a second for the size of the exceedances.

A common assumption for the first is the Poisson distribution, with the generalized Pareto distribution being used for the exceedances. 
A tail-fitting can be based on the Pickands–Balkema–de Haan theorem.

Novak reserves the term “POT method” to the case where the threshold is non-random, and distinguishes it from the case where one deals with  exceedances of a random threshold.

Applications
Applications of extreme value theory include predicting the probability distribution of:
 Extreme floods; the size of freak waves
 Tornado outbreaks
 Maximum sizes of ecological populations
 Side effects of drugs (e.g., ximelagatran)
 The magnitudes of large insurance losses
 Equity risks; day-to-day market risk
 Mutational events during evolution
 Large wildfires
 Environmental loads on structures
 Fastest time humans are capable of running the 100 metres sprint and performances in other athletic disciplines
 Pipeline failures due to pitting corrosion
 Anomalous IT network traffic, prevent attackers from reaching important data
 Road safety analysis
 Wireless communications
Epidemics
Neurobiology

History
The field of extreme value theory was pioneered by Leonard Tippett (1902–1985). Tippett was employed by the British Cotton Industry Research Association, where he worked to make cotton thread stronger. In his studies, he realized that the strength of a thread was controlled by the strength of its weakest fibres. With the help of R. A. Fisher, Tippet obtained three asymptotic limits describing the distributions of extremes assuming independent variables. Emil Julius Gumbel codified this theory in his 1958 book Statistics of Extremes, including the Gumbel distributions that bear his name. These results can be extended to allow for slight correlations between variables, but the classical theory does not extend to strong correlations of the order of the variance. One universality class of particular interest is that of log-correlated fields, where the correlations decay logarithmically with the distance.

Univariate theory
Let  be a sequence of independent and identically distributed random variables with cumulative distribution function F and let  denote the maximum.

In theory, the exact distribution of the maximum can be derived:

The associated indicator function  is a Bernoulli process with a success probability  that depends on the magnitude  of the extreme event. The number of extreme events within  trials thus follows a binomial distribution and the number of trials until an event occurs follows a geometric distribution with expected value and standard deviation of the same order .

In practice, we might not have the distribution function  but the Fisher–Tippett–Gnedenko theorem provides an asymptotic result.  If there exist sequences of constants  and  such that

as  then

where  depends on the tail shape of the distribution.
When normalized, G belongs to one of the following non-degenerate distribution families:

Weibull law:  when the distribution of  has a light tail with finite upper bound.  Also known as Type 3.

Gumbel law:   when the distribution of  has an exponential tail.  Also known as Type 1.

Fréchet law:  when the distribution of  has a heavy tail (including polynomial decay).  Also known as Type 2.

For the Weibull and Fréchet laws, .

Multivariate theory
Extreme value theory in more than one variable introduces additional issues that have to be addressed. One problem that arises is that one must specify what constitutes an extreme event. Although this is straightforward in the univariate case, there is no unambiguous way to do this in the multivariate case. The fundamental problem is that although it is possible to order a set of real-valued numbers, there is no natural way to order a set of vectors.

As an example, in the univariate case, given a set of observations  it is straightforward to find the most extreme event simply by taking the maximum (or minimum) of the observations. However, in the bivariate case, given a set of observations , it is not immediately clear how to find the most extreme event. Suppose that one has measured the values  at a specific time and the values  at a later time. Which of these events would be considered more extreme? There is no universal answer to this question.

Another issue in the multivariate case is that the limiting model is not as fully prescribed as in the univariate case. In the univariate case, the model (GEV distribution) contains three parameters whose values are not predicted by the theory and must be obtained by fitting the distribution to the data. In the multivariate case, the model not only contains unknown parameters, but also a function whose exact form is not prescribed by the theory. However, this function must obey certain constraints. It is not straightforward to devise estimators that obey such constraints though some have been recently constructed.

As an example of an application, bivariate extreme value theory has been applied to ocean research.

Nonstationary extremes
Statistical modeling for nonstationary time series was developed in the 1990's. Methods for nonstationary multivariate extremes have been introduced more recently. The latter can be used for tracking how the dependence between extreme values changes over time, or over another covariate.

See also
 Extreme risk
 Extreme weather
 Fisher–Tippett–Gnedenko theorem
 Generalized extreme value distribution
 Large deviation theory
 Outlier
 Pareto distribution
 Pickands–Balkema–de Haan theorem
 Rare events
 Weibull distribution
 Redundancy principle

Notes

References
 
 
 
 Burry K.V. (1975). Statistical Methods in Applied Science. John Wiley & Sons.
 Castillo E. (1988) Extreme value theory in engineering. Academic Press, Inc. New York. .
 Castillo, E., Hadi, A. S., Balakrishnan, N. and Sarabia, J. M. (2005) Extreme Value and Related Models with Applications in Engineering and Science, Wiley Series in Probability and Statistics Wiley, Hoboken, New Jersey. .
 Coles S. (2001) An Introduction to Statistical Modeling of Extreme Values. Springer, London.
 Embrechts P., Klüppelberg C. and Mikosch T. (1997) Modelling extremal events for insurance and finance. Berlin: Spring Verlag
 
 
 
 
 
 
 Leadbetter M.R., Lindgren G. and Rootzen H. (1982) Extremes and related properties of random sequences and processes. Springer-Verlag, New York.
 
 Novak S.Y. (2011) Extreme Value Methods with Applications to Finance.  Chapman & Hall/CRC Press, London.

Software
 Extreme Value Statistics in R - Packages for extreme value statistics in R
 ExtremeStats.jl and Extremes.jl - Extreme Value Statistics in Julia

External links
 Extreme Value Theory can save your neck Easy non-mathematical introduction (pdf)
 Source Code for Stationary and Nonstationary Extreme Value Analysis University of California, Irvine
 Steps in Applying Extreme Value Theory to Finance: A Review
 Les valeurs extrêmes des distributions statistiques Full-text access to conferences held by E. J. Gumbel in 1933–34, in French (pdf)

Actuarial science
Statistical theory
Extreme value data
Tails of probability distributions
Financial risk modeling